Dirk Elbers (born 11 December 1959) German politician, representative of the German Christian Democratic Union.

After the death of Lord Mayor Joachim Erwin, who died in office, on 2 June 2008 Elbers was a candidate for the CDU to become mayor. The election took place on 31 August 2008. Dirk Elbers won this election on the first ballot with 59.7% of the vote against his candidate against Karin Kortmann from the SPD. The turnout was around 38%.

See also
List of German Christian Democratic Union politicians

References

Christian Democratic Union of Germany politicians
1959 births
Living people
Mayors of Düsseldorf